Frederick Charles Bracher (25 October 1868 – 23 December 1947) was an English cricketer active in the late 1890s. Born at Bedminster, Bristol, Bracher made 13 first-class appearances for Gloucestershire.

Bracher made his first-class debut for Gloucestershire against Somerset in the 1895 County Championship at the Ashley Down Ground, Bristol, with him making six further appearances in that season. He made five appearances in the 1896 County Championship, before making a final appearance in 1897 against Yorkshire. A batsman of unknown handedness, Bracher scored a total of 163 runs in his thirteen first-class appearances, top-scoring with 21 and averaging just 7.40 per-innings.

He died at Portishead, Somerset on 23 December 1947.

References

External links
Frederick Bracher at ESPNcricinfo
Frederick Bracher at CricketArchive

1868 births
1947 deaths
Cricketers from Bristol
English cricketers
Gloucestershire cricketers